Maximiliano Javier Amondarain Colzada (born 22 January 1993) is a Uruguayan footballer who plays as a centre back for Alianza Atlético.

He began his career in his native Uruguay, playing for Nacional and Progreso. After a successful trial, he moved to Cardiff City but did not make an appearance for the first team during a two-year spell with the Bluebirds. He has also represented the Uruguay U20 national team.

Club career
Amondarain was born in Montevideo. After graduating from Nacional's youth system, he was loaned to Progreso in 2012 summer. Progreso also kept an agreement with Nacional by receiving a part of the sale if the player was sold. Amondarain made his professional debut on 7 October 2012, in a 0–2 away defeat against Fénix. He finished the season with 18 appearances, and returned to Nacional.

On 30 August 2013, Cardiff City confirmed the signing of the free agent Amondarain after an impressive trial period earlier in the summer. He signed a four-year deal with the club after a one-month trial basis. Amondarain's contract with Cardiff was terminated by mutual agreement on 24 June 2015, having played no senior games for the club.

On 21 November he joined Elche CF's reserve team on a trial basis, signing a contract in December being registered in the first team in January.

Prior to the 2016–17 Jupiler League season, he spent time on trial with FC Emmen but was not offered a permanent contract.

Amondarain signed for Barakaldo in October 2016, moving to the same Basque region from where his grandparents had emigrated to South America at the time of the Spanish Civil War.

Honours
Uruguay 
FIFA U-20 World Cup: 2013 Runner-up

References

External links

1993 births
Living people
Footballers from Montevideo
Uruguayan footballers
Uruguayan people of Basque descent
Association football defenders
Uruguayan Primera División players
Tercera División players
Segunda División B players
Club Nacional de Football players
C.A. Progreso players
Cardiff City F.C. players
Barakaldo CF footballers
Elche CF Ilicitano footballers
UB Conquense footballers
Orihuela CF players
C.A. Rentistas players
Uruguay under-20 international footballers
Uruguayan expatriate footballers
Expatriate footballers in Wales
Expatriate footballers in Spain
Uruguayan expatriate sportspeople in Wales
Uruguayan expatriate sportspeople in Spain